Zhang Hong is the name of:

Zhang Hong (Han dynasty) (153–212), Han-era official and scholar under the warlords Sun Ce and Sun Quan
Zhang Hong (handballer) (born 1966), Chinese handball player
Zhang Hong (speed skater) (born 1988), Chinese speed skater
Hong Zhang (scientist), Chinese-born robotics researcher at the University of Alberta, Canada
Arnold Chang (aka Zhang Hong) (born 1954), American painter and calligrapher

See also
Zhanghong (张洪), a town in Xunyi County, Shaanxi, China